The 2020 TBL season is the third season of The Basketball League (TBL). In March 18, amid the COVID-19 pandemic, the season was cancelled without completion.

League changes

Organization
On June 29, 2019, league CEO Evelyn Magley announced Kayla Crosby as the director of team development for approving new teams. Crosby is the owner and founder of the Jamestown Jackals.

Teams
It was announced that the Albany Patroons had been sold to new ownership. The Yakima SunKings were not included as 2020 member and the Mesquite Desert Dogs withdrew due to the travel constraints as the only remaining west coast team.

The league also added the Columbus Condors, Dayton Flight, Dallas Skyline, Gulf Coast Lions, Indy Express, Lewisville Yellow Jackets, and the Tri-State Admirals as expansion teams. The TBL added the Gulf Coast Lions, based in the Bradenton/Sarasota area, as the league's seventh new team for the 2020 season. The San Diego Waves were replaced by expansion San Diego Armada while the Waves were being relocated, but neither team would make the 2020 schedule.

Standings
Final standings:

Awards

All-TBL Awards 2020:

Player of the Year: Corey Taite (Tri-State Admirals)
Guard of the Year: Corey Taite (Tri-State Admirals)
Forward of the Year: Ricardo Artis III (Dallas Skyline)
Center of the Year: Terry Maston (Dallas Skyline)

All-League 1st Team
PG: Corey Taite (Tri-State Admirals)
PG: Daylon Guy (Dallas Skyline)
SG: Bassel Harfouch (Tampa Bay Titans)
F: Ricardo Artis III (Dallas Skyline)
F/C: Terry Maston (Dallas Skyline)

All-League 2nd Team
G: Shadell Millinghaus (Albany Patroons)
G: Joe Retic (Indy Express)
G: Andy Bosley (Columbus Condors)
G/F: Robert Vaden (Indy Express)
F/C: Anthony-Moe (Albany Patroons)

All-League 3rd Team
PG: Taishaun Johnson (Dayton Flight)
PG: Micheal Lenoir (Lewisville Yellow Jackets)
G/F: Davon Hayes (Owensboro Thoroughbreds)
F: Balsa Bazovic (Lewisville Yellow Jackets)
F: James Currington (Tri-State Admirals)

Draft
The 2020 player draft for the league was held on December 8, 2019. The first overall TBL selection Rahim Williams was taken by Gulf Coast Lions.

Although some of the players chosen in the draft had played semi-professional or professional basketball after college graduation, only the United States colleges they attended are listed.

References

External links
TBL website

The Basketball League seasons
TBL Draft